Leslie Pamela Cook-Ioannidis (born  1945) is an American mathematician, the Unidel Professor of Mathematical Sciences and Professor of Chemical Engineering at the University of Delaware. She was the president of the Society for Industrial and Applied Mathematics (SIAM) for 2015–2016. Her research concerns fluid dynamics.

Education and career
Cook earned a bachelor's degree from the University of Rochester in 1967, and a master's and a Ph.D. from Cornell University in 1969 and 1971, respectively.

After visiting positions at Cornell and the California Institute of Technology, she joined the faculty of the University of California, Los Angeles in 1973. She moved to Delaware in 1983. 
At the University of Delaware, she was chair of the Department of Mathematical Sciences for nine years before becoming associate dean of engineering. She also served as chair of the university's Commission on the Status of Women.

Contributions and recognition
With Julian Cole, she is the author of the book Transonic Aerodynamics (North-Holland, 1986).

She is a fellow of the American Association for the Advancement of Science and of SIAM.

References

External links

Year of birth missing (living people)
1940s births
Living people
20th-century American mathematicians
21st-century American mathematicians
American women mathematicians
University of Rochester alumni
Cornell University alumni
University of California, Los Angeles faculty
University of Delaware faculty
Fellows of the American Association for the Advancement of Science
Fellows of the Society for Industrial and Applied Mathematics
Presidents of the Society for Industrial and Applied Mathematics
Place of birth missing (living people)
20th-century women mathematicians
21st-century women mathematicians
20th-century American women
21st-century American women